Invasion from Inner Earth (1974) is an apocalyptic science fiction film, starring Paul Bentzen and Debbi Pick. The film was directed by Bill Rebane, the same director of Monster A Go-Go (1965), and The Giant Spider Invasion (1975). The film, also known as Hell Fire and They, was inspired by the British film The Strange World of Planet X (1957), and filmed in the style of thrillers directed by Alfred Hitchcock.

Plot 
A group of pilots in the Canadian wilderness begin to hear strange reports over their radios about planes crashing, cars stalling, and a deadly plague which has gripped the planet. As the plot continues, it's clear that Earth is in the midst of an invasion. The pilots barricade themselves in a cabin in the woods and wait for impending doom.

Reception

Creature Feature gave the film one star, calling it lumbering, the special effects awful, and the ending incomprehensible, Fantastic Movie Musings found it almost completely devoid of entertainment value featuring an ending that shows a 20-minute walk.

Cast
 Paul Bentzen
 Debbi Pick
 Nick Holt
 Karl Wallace
 Robert Arkens
 Arnold Didrickson
 James Steadman
 David Pray
 Mary O'Keefe

References

External links 
 
 . MisterRiffley reviews it under that alternate title.

Films directed by Bill Rebane
1974 films
1974 horror films
1970s science fiction horror films
Alien invasions in films
1970s English-language films